Cockeysville is a census-designated place (CDP) in Baltimore County, Maryland, United States. The population was 20,776 at the 2010 census.

History
Cockeysville was named after the Cockey family who helped establish the town. Thomas Cockey (1676–1737) settled in Limestone Valley in 1725 at Taylor's Hall (an area now just north of Padonia Road and east of Interstate 83). Joshua Frederick Cockey (1765–1821) built one of the first homes in the area in 1798 and built the first commercial structure, a hotel, in 1810 in what would become the village of Cockeysville. His son, Judge Joshua F. Cockey (1800–1891), was a lifelong resident in the village. As a businessman before being appointed as judge, in the 1830s he built the train station (which would be a stop on the Pennsylvania Railroad) and accompanying commercial buildings.

Cockeysville was the scene of some Civil War activity. Confederate soldiers pushed into the Baltimore area, intending to cut off the city and Washington from the north. On July 10, 1864, Confederate cavalry under General Bradley T. Johnson entered Cockeysville, destroying telegraph lines and track along the Northern Central Railway. They also burned the first bridge over the Gunpowder Falls, just beyond nearby Ashland.

 After the war, Joshua F. Cockey III (1837–1920) founded the National Bank of Cockeysville (1891) and other commercial ventures in the community, as well as developing dwellings along the York Turnpike (now York Road) that made up the village of Cockeysville.

Stone Hall was listed on the National Register of Historic Places in 1973. Baltimore County School No. 7 was listed in 2000.

Local institutions
Cockeysville is home to the Cockeysville Branch of the Baltimore County Public Library and the Historical Society of Baltimore County.

Schools in Cockeysville
Public schools:
 Padonia International Elementary
 Warren Elementary School
 Cockeysville Middle School
 Dulaney High School in Timonium, Maryland, which is nearby to Cockeysville MD

Private schools:
 St. Joseph School (Pre-K - 8)

Grand Lodge

The Grand Lodge of Maryland, Ancient, Free, and Accepted Masons, is located in Cockeysville on a  campus. It includes a castle-like structure known as Bonnie Blink ("Beautiful View" in Scots), which is the retirement home for Master Masons, Eastern Star ladies and eligible family members. Located throughout the Grand Lodge are detailed, hand-laid tile storyboards depicting Masonic themes.

Adjacent to the Grand Lodge building is the Freemason's Hall, containing the Maryland Grand Lodge Museum. The museum has the desk that George Washington resigned his commission on, prior to becoming president, a rare Latin Bible from 1482, and some jewels and regalia of Maryland's past Grand Masters.

Commerce and industry
The Texas Quarry, near of the intersection of I-83 and Warren Road, dating back to the 19th century, produces limestone and marble, including the marble used in the first phase of construction (1848–54) of the Washington Monument, the whiter portion towards the bottom half of the monument. During the second phase of construction (1880–84) the monument had to be finished using a slightly different-colored stone, most of which came from the Beaver Dam Quarry (now Beaverdam Pond) near the intersection of Beaver Dam Road and McCormick Road.

Blocks of local marble were also used in 1836 as rail supports in the track bed for the Padonia Road section of the Baltimore and Susquehanna Railroad (which later became part of the Northern Central Railway); the use of marble instead of wood was an experiment that was soon after abandoned.

Geography
Cockeysville is located at  (39.473273, −76.626703), north of the Baltimore Beltway (Interstate 695) along Interstate 83 and York Road. It is bordered on the east by Loch Raven Reservoir, on the south by Timonium, and on the west by rural Baltimore County. Most commercial activity is concentrated along York Road.

Geology

The Precambrian, Cambrian, or Ordovician Cockeysville Marble underlies much of Cockeysville and has been quarried there.

Transportation

Roads
Baltimore-Harrisburg Expressway (I-83)
Beaver Dam Road
Cranbrook Road
McCormick Road
Padonia Road
Paper Mill Road (MD-145)
Shawan Road
Tufton Avenue
Warren Road (MD-943)
York Road (MD-45)

Public transportation
The Maryland Transit Administration's Light RailLink line runs through Cockeysville. The Warren Road stop is the stop in the area.

Bus Route 93 operates along York and some other roads in the area.

Northern Central Railway

The area used to be served by the Northern Central Railway, a wholly owned subsidiary of the Pennsylvania Railroad (PRR). Located on the PRR's Baltimore-Harrisburg mainline, Cockeysville saw the passage of many named interstate passenger trains as late as the 1960s, such as the Liberty Limited and the General to Chicago.

President Abraham Lincoln traveled through Cockeysville on the Northern Central Railway en route to Gettysburg, Pennsylvania, to deliver the Gettysburg Address in 1863.  Less than two years later, on April 21, 1865, Lincoln's funeral train also passed through Cockeysville on its way from Washington, D.C., to his final resting place at Springfield, Illinois.

South of Cockeysville, the Baltimore Light RailLink uses the corridor established by the predecessors of the Northern Central; the corridor north is now the Torrey C. Brown Rail Trail.

Demographics

2010

2000
As of the census of 2000, there were 19,388 people, 9,176 households, and 4,450 families residing in the CDP. The racial makeup of the CDP was 77.97% White, 9.89% Asian, 8.87% African American, 0.29% Native American, 0.02% Pacific Islander, 1.02% from other races, and 1.94% from two or more races. Hispanic or Latino of any race were 3.39% of the population.

There were 9,176 households, out of which 22.5% had children under the age of 18 living with them, 35.9% were married couples living together, 9.2% had a female householder with no husband present, and 51.5% were non-families. 38.9% of all households were made up of individuals, and 7.1% had someone living alone who was 65 years of age or older. The average household size was 2.10 and the average family size was 2.87.

In the CDP, the population was spread out, with 18.9% under the age of 18, 13.3% from 18 to 24, 36.5% from 25 to 44, 21.2% from 45 to 64, and 10.1% who were 65 years of age or older. The median age was 33 years. For every 100 females, there were 93.7 males. For every 100 females age 18 and over, there were 93.8 males.

The median income for a household in the CDP was $43,681, and the median income for a family was $62,266 (these figures had risen to $60,088 and $92,392 respectively as of a 2007 estimate). Males had a median income of $40,732 versus $32,177 for females. The per capita income for the CDP was $29,080. About 4.7% of families and 8.2% of the population were below the poverty line, including 7.1% of those under age 18 and 5.5% of those age 65 or over.

See also
Hunt Valley, Maryland, adjoining Cockeysville

References

External links

 Historical Society of Baltimore County
 Hunt Valley community page

 
Census-designated places in Baltimore County, Maryland
Census-designated places in Maryland